Fountain Creek Regional Park and Nature Center is a park and nature center in Fountain, El Paso County, Colorado near Colorado Springs.

Overview
The park is free with a nature center and nature trails for hiking, leashed pet walking and horseback riding. The nature center is open Tuesday through Saturday.

The park's ponds and springs are a sanctuary to waterfowl, wildlife and birds, like red-winged blackbirds.

Gallery

See also
 Bear Creek Regional Park and Nature Center, the other Colorado Springs area Nature Center

References

External links

 Fountain Creek Nature Center, El Paso County, Colorado

Parks in El Paso County, Colorado
United States
Nature centers in Colorado